The 13th Apostle is a 1988 Soviet science fiction film directed by Suren Babayan, loosely based on the 1950 book The Martian Chronicles by Ray Bradbury.

Plot
The crew of а space expedition dies under mysterious circumstances. After 15 years, an inspector investigates why the exploration of a planet was abandoned. To do this, he visits the only surviving member of the crew, Captain Amos, who now lives in a shelter for retired astronauts. In the report, he made a ban on further exploration of this planet.

It turns out that the inhabitants of the planet took on the appearance of the crew members' deceased relatives to inspire the idea that a quarantine regime is needed in this place. Moreover, the captain returns accompanied by a certain being (the "apostle"), who possesses Absalom.

Cast
Juozas Budraitis — Captain Amos
Andrei Boltnev — Inspector
Vladas Bagdonas — Apostle / Absalom
Armen Dzhigarkhanyan — David, director of the shelter
Donatas Banionis — father
Algis Matulionis — priest
Valentinas Masalskis - member of the expedition
Juris Riiinieks — member of the expedition
Mikk Mikiver — member of the expedition (in credits Mick Mikiver)
Karen Dzhanibekyan — member of the expedition
Vladimir Kocharyan
Levon Nersesyan
Ingeborga Dapkūnaitė — Maria
Elle Kull — Elma, nurse in the shelter
Irena Kuksenate
Neole Geljinite
Irena Cresuote
Ilona Balsite
Joseph Nalbandian
Georgiy Sichkar
Mikael Dovlatyan

References

External links

Armenian science fiction films
Armenfilm films
Soviet science fiction films
1980s science fiction films
Films based on works by Ray Bradbury